"Megatron" (stylized in all caps) is a song by Trinidadian-American rapper Nicki Minaj, released as a standalone single on June 21, 2019, along with its accompanying music video. The song also contains a sample of "Murder She Wrote" by Chaka Demus and Pliers.

Background and release
"Megatron" is Minaj's only solo single released in 2019.  Prior to release, Minaj was on a social media hiatus after wrapping up her world tour, The Nicki Wrld Tour, in Europe.

Music and lyrics
"Megatron" was co-written by Minaj, Brittany "Chi" Coney, Denisia "Blu Jones" Andrews, Haldane Wayne Browne, and Andrew "Pop" Wansel, with additional production by Nova Wav and co-production by Minaj.  The song's lyrical content reflects on the spirit of partying, dating, and flirtation.  The song's sound is a Caribbean-inspired uptempo rhythm.

Promotion
The song was first teased by Minaj on June 12, 2019, when the rapper posted the word "Megatron" to her social media accounts. One day after, Minaj uploaded a series of pictures from the music video's set, announcing the song's release date and an episode of her own Beats 1 show, Queen Radio, for the same day. A teaser for the music video was posted on June 19. Model Blac Chyna showed support to the song's visuals by posing in pictures with similar backgrounds to Minaj's teasers, leading to speculation she would feature in the music video, rumors Minaj quickly shut down. One day prior to the record's release, the rapper posted a video with her then-boyfriend and now husband, Kenneth Petty, and continued to tease the song.

Music video
On June 19, Minaj released the first teaser for the music video. On June 21, the music video, directed by Mike Ho, was officially premiered on the rapper's YouTube channel. The music video has since received over 100 million views.

Commercial performance
In the United States, "Megatron" debuted and peaked at number 20 on the Billboard Hot 100. It spent five non-consecutive weeks on the chart. It also reached number 21 on the Rhythmic Songs airplay chart.

Credits and personnel
Credits adapted from Tidal.

 Nicki Minaj – vocals, songwriting, co-production
 Pop Wansel – songwriting, production, programming
 Brittany "Chi" Coney – production
 Denisia "Blu June" Andrews – production
 Haldane Wayne Browne – production
 Nova Wav – additional production, programming
 Aubry "Big Juice" Delaine – record engineering
 Jacob Richards – mixing engineering
 Jaycen Joshua – mixing

Charts

Certifications

Release history

References

2019 singles
2019 songs
Cash Money Records singles
Dancehall songs
Nicki Minaj songs
Republic Records singles
Songs written by Nicki Minaj
Songs written by Pop Wansel
Young Money Entertainment singles
Songs about fictional male characters
Songs about fictional characters
Songs about alcohol